The Departmental Council of Lot is the deliberative assembly of the Lot department in the region of Occitanie. It consists of 34 members (general councilors) from 17 cantons and its headquarters are in Cahors, capital of the department.

The President of the General Council is Serge Rigal.

Vice-Presidents 
The President of the Departmental Council is assisted by 10 vice-presidents chosen from among the departmental advisers. Each of them has a delegation of authority.

References

See also 

 Lot
 General councils of France
 Departmental Council of Lot (official website)

Lot
Lot (department)